Mokhtarabad may refer to the following places in Iran:
 Mokhtarabad, Alborz
 Mokhtarabad, Ardabil
 Mokhtarabad, Fars
 Mokhtarabad, Kerman
 Mokhtarabad, Rudbar-e Jonubi, Kerman Province
 Mokhtarabad, Jazmurian, Rudbar-e Jonubi County, Kerman Province
 Mokhtarabad, Lorestan